The Tetrarch (1911–1935) was an Irish-bred, British-trained Thoroughbred racehorse. He was undefeated in a racing career of seven starts and was voted the best British-trained two-year-old of the 20th century according to the National Horseracing Museum. He did not race after 1913 and was retired to stud where he became an influential sire.

Breeding
Foaled at Straffan Station Stud, near Ardclough, in County Kildare in Ireland, he was sired by Roi Herode (France) out of Vahren. His damsire (Bona Vista) was by Bend Or (after whom Bend-Or spots are named). The Tetrarch was a gangly and less-than-attractive colt whose grey coat was sprinkled with white blotches. Dismissed as having no racing potential by some buyers, he was ultimately sold by his breeder to Major Dermot McCalmont and placed under the care of trainer Atty Persse.

Racing record and legacy
Sent to the track as a two-year-old, under jockey Steve Donoghue The Tetrarch easily defeated his competition. Quickly dubbed the "Spotted Wonder," he easily won all seven of his 1913 starts. In his one real test he came from behind to capture the National Breeders' Produce Stakes by a neck, but that one close finish only resulted after a mix-up at the start that left him four or five lengths back. An injury in October 1913 ended The Tetrarch's two-year-old racing campaign. The following spring he reinjured himself in training. His handlers were hoping he would heal sufficiently to return to racing, but by the end of 1914 came to the conclusion that he would never race again.

There is (as with many star two-year-olds) the question of what The Tetrarch's – and his competition's – continued physical development would have meant to his racing performance at age three. In 1913 The Tetrarch easily beat all comers including Stornoway, who won several races that year; among them were the Gimcrack and Norfolk Stakes (now The Flying Childers Stakes). However (as noted in the Thoroughbred Heritage website), none of The Tetrarch's races were more than six furlongs (¾ mile) and because he never raced at age three, he was not tested at standard mile to mile-and-a-half distances. His bloodlines, though, pointed to stamina.

It is also noted that the 1913 crop of two-year-olds was less than spectacular, and the 1914 Champion Stakes, Ascot Gold Cup and the three British Classic Races for colts were all won by different horses with less-than-distinguished career records. The question of The Tetrarch's ability at longer distances is a legitimate one. His successful son Tetratema lost at seven furlongs and won one race at eight furlongs (one mile); of his twelve other wins, all were at five to six furlongs. The Tetrarch's speedy daughter Mumtaz Mahal won five important sprint races at age two but at age three was beaten at her first tries at longer distances. In two one mile races, she finished second in the 1,000 Guineas and was fifth in the Coronation Stakes. Mumtaz Mahal's handlers then limited her to competing only in sprint races and she won the six-furlong King George Stakes and the five-furlong Nunthorpe Stakes.

While on the other hand his son (Salmon-Trout) was not only a good juvenile racing at five to seven furlongs but would maintain racing form well into his three old season, winning The Princess of Wales's Stakes (a 12-furlong race) and the St. Leger Stakes (a 14-plus-furlong race).  The Tetrarch is also produced two other St. Leger Stakes winners (Polemarch and Caligula), which would indicate that the birth of Salmon-Trout was not just a fluke. Some of his progeny were great sprinters and stayed that way, while others went on to mature into very well-rounded distance champions. The abilities of The Tetrarch’s progeny ranged so wildly that it is difficult to tell whether or not he would have filled out as a three-year-old by looking at his offspring alone.

Lauded for his greatness on the track by racing personalities and fans of the day, many appraisals of The Tetrarch decades after his death have been equally glowing. The United Kingdom's National Horseracing Museum called The Tetrarch a "phenomenon" and report that he was voted Britain's two-year-old of his century. In their description of the colt, the National Sporting Library's Thoroughbred Heritage website in the United States calls The Tetrarch "probably the greatest two-year-old of all time" and "possibly the greatest runner ever".

Stud record
In 1915 he was sent to Thomastown Stud in County Kilkenny, Ireland, and later moved to his owner's Ballylinch Stud just east of Thomastown. The Tetrarch had difficulty as a stallion due to a lack of interest, and would be plagued by infertility problems for a number of years. Although he sired only 130 foals throughout his stud career his progeny inherited his blazing speed, and in 1919 he was the leading sire in Great Britain & Ireland as a result of the performances of Tetratema and the filly Snow Maiden. Another daughter (Mumtaz Mahal) won a number of important sprint races and, according to "Thoroughbred Heritage" went on to become one of the most important broodmares of the 20th century.

Mumatz Mahal became an important ancestress in the pedigrees of some of history's most influential sire lines, including Nasrullah, Royal Charger, Tudor Minstrel and Mahmoud.  Nasrullah sired Bold Ruler, the sire of the Seattle Slew/A.P. Indy modern stallion lines.  Bold Ruler is possibly most famous for producing Secretariat, renowned for his stamina and also an influential broodmare sire.  Nasrullah also produced the lines leading to Red God (1954), Grey Sovereign (1956) and Never Bend (1960). The Tetrarch also sired Paola (who won the 1923 Coronation Stakes) and The Satrap (champion two-year-old of 1926).

As for questions regarding The Tetrarch's potential to win at a distance, three sons won the St. Leger Stakes (the longest classic) – Caligula (1920), Polemarch (1921) and Salmon-Trout (1924).

The Tetrarch died at Ballylinch Stud on 8 August 1935 at the age of twenty-four, and is buried there in the farm's equine cemetery.

Pedigree 

The Tetrarch is inbred 4 × 4 to Speculum, Doncaster and Rouge Rose, meaning both horses appear twice in the fourth generation of his pedigree.

Cultural reference 
The Tetrarch is referenced in Siegfried Sassoon's 1919 poem Sporting Acquaintances as a racehorse he had bet on before the First world war.

See also
 Flying Childers Stakes
 List of leading Thoroughbred racehorses
 Steve Donoghue

References

External links
 The Tetrarch's pedigree and racing stats
 The Tetrarch at Thoroughbred Heritage
 The Tetrarch's profile at the United Kingdom's National Horseracing Museum

1911 racehorse births
1935 racehorse deaths
British Champion Thoroughbred Sires
Racehorses bred in Ireland
Racehorses trained in the United Kingdom
Undefeated racehorses
Thoroughbred family 2-o
Byerley Turk sire line
Chefs-de-Race